Simonas Paulius (born 12 May 1991) is a Lithuanian footballer who plays as a midfielder for FA Šiauliai.

Club career 
On 1 July 2012 Paulius moved to FK Ventspils.

In 2018 in the first half of season he played for FK Kauno Žalgiris, in the second half for Widzew Łódź.

Achievements 
FK Ventspils
 Latvian Cup winner (2): 2013, 2017
 Latvian Championship winner (2): 2013, 2014
 Latvian Championship 3rd place (2): 2015, 2016

International career 
In May 2016 Paulius made his debut game for Lithuania squad against Estonia.

References

External links 
 Simonas Paulius at uefa.com

1991 births
Sportspeople from Kretinga
Living people
Lithuanian footballers
Lithuania international footballers
Lithuania under-21 international footballers
Association football midfielders
FBK Kaunas footballers
FK Dainava Alytus players
FK Ventspils players
FK Kauno Žalgiris players
Widzew Łódź players
A Lyga players
Latvian Higher League players
II liga players
Lithuanian expatriate footballers
Expatriate footballers in Latvia
Expatriate footballers in Poland